Springport Mid-Michigan Speedway is a 3/8th mile, high-banked, oval short track located northwest of Springport, Michigan.

Springport Mid-Michigan Speedway opened in the fall of 1989 under the name of Michigan Ideal Speedway. Built to replicate the dimensions of Michigan International Speedway, but on a 3/8th mile scale.

Seating 5300 spectators at maximum capacity, the track sits in the countryside of Calhoun County, a 45-minute drive from the Irish Hills and Michigan International Speedway.

History
Springport Mid-Michigan Speedway opened in the fall of 1989 under the name of Michigan Ideal Speedway.

Michigan Ideal Speedway was the dream of Russ Densmore. Densmore owned a local propane company in Springport, Michigan, and he was on the fire and safety crew at Michigan International Speedway. In 1988 Russ Densmore was the fire crew chief at Spartan Speedway, a position he had held in previous seasons under the ownership of Paul Zimmerman. After an evening of racing, Densmore and new Spartan owner Russ Cowper (Cowper also owned the Galeburg Speedway) had a conflict over some facet of track operation, Mr. Cowper challenged Densmore "If you think you know so much about running a race track, why don't you go get your own".

Mr. Densmore purchased  farm & farm house in the extreme North East corner of Calhoun County and build his dream short track and called it Michigan Ideal Speedway.

One of the major contractors/builders was also a local racer named Jim "Barney" Barnhardt.  Not only did Barney help build the track, he was the first ever driver to take a race car onto the speedway and held the track record for 6 years.  He was also the first driver to wreck a car on the speedway.

During the first race on that fall afternoon, Bill Tyler was given the first upside down trophy (it was more of a nose stand in the first turn). He went on to win the sprint feature that day. Other winners from the first race were: Late Models - Joe Dorer and Charlie Evens, Mini Champs - Andy Michner, IMCA Modifieds - Dan Bailey, Factory Stocks - Tim West, Pro Stocks - John Smalley, Ed Santora, and Dick Margo.

No season champions were crowned in 1989 as only one race was held.

In 1990, the first Late Model Champion was Jeff Finley.

In 1998, Russ Densmore sold the track to an ownership group out of Jackson, Michigan headed by Ronnie Johncox. Ronnie Johncox was an Indy Car owner and driver who was participating on the Indy Car Series at the time of purchase.

Johncox operated and promoted the track for two seasons until he closed the track after the 2000 season due to financial issues.  The track remained closed for the 2001, '02 and '03 race seasons.

In 2003, the track was purchased by Spartan Speedway owners Paul Zimmerman and Jim Leasure, and the track re-opened for the 2004 season as "Calhoun County Speedway".

In 2005, the track started the season as Calhoun County Speedway. During the season the name of the facility was changed to Springport Mid-Michigan Speedway.

In 2006 the track was promoted by local racing legend Gary Fedewa (along with Spartan Speedway) but again, financial issues closed the track early, in August.

In 2007 Zimmerman/Leasure leased the track to local racer and businessmen Maurice Randall. Randall was formerly a NASCAR and ARCA driver.  Track successfully completed the season, but for 2008, track ownership decided not to lease the track out and instead operate it themselves.

The 2008 season was completed in full and at the conclusion of the season the track was sold/leased to Jerry Rabbers. Rabbers changed the name of the track to "Mid-Michigan Speedway" and launched an ambitious schedule and payout. In July 2009, the track suspended operations and in August ownership/operation reverted to Leasure.

In 2010 and 2011 the track was successfully leased and operated by Steve Martin.  The Springport Mid-Michigan Speedway website http://www.springportracing.com is full of information for the current season.

If you have been to the track and watched, or raced, come back and enjoy yourself again. If you have never been, there could not be a better time to give the premier racing facility in the tri-state area a try. Springport Mid-Michigan Speedway: Michigan's Ideal Speedway.

Notable alumni
Bill Elliott, Sarah Fisher, Sarah McCune, Stephen Leicht, Mike Buckley, Kenny Irwin, David Stremme, Ryan Newman.

Track Time Line

1989 : Track opens under owner Russ Densmore as Michigan Ideal Speedway.
1989 : Track announcer is Mick Shuler
1991 : Track runs on Sunday Nights for the 1991 season
1991 : First Annual Michigan Cup Held
1999 : Track sold to ownership group led by Ronnie Johncox and operated as Springport Speedway
2001 - 2003 : Track was dormant
2003 : Track sold to Paul Zimmerman & Jim Leasure and operated as Calhoun County Speedway 
2005 : Track operated as Springport Mid-Michigan Speedway 
2009 : Track was leased to Jerry Rabbers and operated as Mid-Michigan Speedway
2010 : Track was leased to Steve Martin, the named returned to Springport Mid-Michigan Speedway
2011 : The first full-time season Outlaw late models returned to the track since 2004 The Modified's returned full-time since 2006
2012 - 2015 : Springport Mid-Michigan Speedway was leased to Jeff & Pam Parish (former Whittemore Speedway, Owosso Speedway, Dixie Motor Speedway,Promoters)
2016–Present : Springport Mid-Michigan Speedway was purchased by brothers John & Curt Ainsworth and the name changed to Springport Mid-Michigan Speedway

Current special events
 Michigan Cup
 The First Call

Track Records
Winged Sprint Car:
Non Winged Spring Car:
Super Late Model:
Late Model:
Sportsman:
Modified:
Outlaw Modified:
Street Stock:
RWD Pure Stock: Kyle Drake 18.754 2008
FWD Pure Stock:
Outlaw FWD Pony Stock:
FWD Pony Stock:

Track Champions

 n/a : Non Applicable; Class not run that season
 ^ : ICAR class rules
 ^^ : Limited Late Model rules
 ~ : Pro Stock rules
 ~~ : Michigan Iron, Ideal Iron rules

External links 
 Springport Mid-Michigan Speedway Official Site
 The Official Facebook Page of the Speedway
 Springport Mid-Michigan Speedway Page at WaterWinterWonderland on 
 North American Motorsports Pages: Springport Mid-Michigan Speedway Page - Track information

Buildings and structures in Calhoun County, Michigan
Motorsport venues in Michigan
NASCAR tracks
Tourist attractions in Calhoun County, Michigan
Sports venues completed in 1989
Sports in Calhoun County, Michigan